The 2017–18 Red Stripe Premier League is the highest competitive football league in Jamaica. It is the 44th edition of the competition. The regular season started on September 24, 2017. Arnett Gardens are the defending champions, having won their 5th title last season.

Teams 
Maverley Hughenden and Jamalco finished 11th and 12th in last season's competition and were relegated to their respective regional Super Leagues, the KSAFA Super League and South Central Confederation Super League respectively. At the end of last season, the champions of the four Super Leagues participated in a promotion playoff double round-robin tournament. Cavalier and Sandals South Coast finished 1st and 2nd after the playoff and were promoted to the National Premier League for this season.

Regular season

Results

Regular Home Games

Additional Home Games

Playoffs

Bracket

Results

Quarterfinals

Semifinals 
The winners of these ties will qualify for the CFU Club Championship.

Finals

Top goalscorers

References

External links
 Jamaicafootballfederation.com
 National Premier League

National Premier League seasons
1
Jamaica